National Highway 81, commonly referred to as NH 81, is a highway connecting the city of Coimbatore to Chidambaram in South India. This highway was previously part of old national highways 67 and 227 but subsequent to rationalisation of national highway numbers of India by Gazette notification on 5 March 2010 it was changed to National Highway 81.

Route

Junctions 

  Terminal near Coimbatore.
  near Avinashipalayam
  near Vellakoil
  near Karur
  near Tiruchirappalli
  near Paluvur(Keezhapalur)
  near Gangaikonda Cholapuram
  Terminal near Chidambaram.

See also 
 List of National Highways in India
 List of National Highways in India by state

References

External links
 NH 81 on OpenStreetMap

National highways in India
81